The following is a comprehensive discography of Way Out West, an English electronic music duo. Their discography comprises five studio albums, two compilation albums, two EPs, twenty five singles and other releases.

Albums

Studio albums

Compilation albums

Extended plays

Singles

Remixes
 1992: Echo – "The Jug"
 1993: Sub-Version 3 – "Paradise (Is the Sound)"
 1993: Eight – "I Believe in Emotion"
 1993: Echo – "Avalanche"
 1993: A Certain Ratio – "Tekno"
 1994: Anthony White – "Love Me Tonight"
 1994: Royal 'T' – "Coming Back for More"
 1994: Sasha – "Magic"
 1994: Marcella Detroit – "I Feel Free"
 1994: Flybaby – "Fiesta"
 1994: A Certain Ratio – "Wild Party"
 1994: Respect featuring Hannah Jones – "Young Hearts Run Free"
 1994: Subliminal Cuts – "Le Voie Le Soleil"
 1995: Reel 2 Real featuring The Mad Stuntman – "Conway"
 1995: Liquid – "Sweet Harmony"
 1995: Bel Canto – "We've Got to Work It Out"
 1995: Dubstar – "Not So Manic Now"
 1995: Dubstar – "Stars"
 1995: José Padilla – "Sabor De Verano"
 1995: Kamasutra – "Censored"
 1995: Movin' Melodies Production – "La Luna"
 1995: John Digweed – "Love Me Tonight"
 1996: Faithless – "Salva Mea"
 1996: 108 Grand – "Tonight"
 1996: Castle Trancelott – "Indoctrinate"
 1996: Lucky Monkeys – "Bjango"
 1996: Saint Etienne – "Angel"
 1996: Last Rhythm – "Last Rhythm"
 1996: Harmonix – "Landslide"
 1996: The Tabernacle – "I Know the Lord"
 1996: X-Press 2 – "Tranz Euro Xpress"
 1996: Way Out West – "Domination"
 1996: Freak Power – "New Direction"
 1996: JX – "There's Nothing I Won't Do"
 1996: Roni Size / Reprazent – "Share the Fall"
 1997: Clanger – "Seadog"
 1997: Marco Zaffarano – "The Band"
 1997: Republica – "Bitch"
 1997: Way Out West – Ajare
 1997: B.B.E. – "Desire"
 1997: Section X – "Atlantis"
 1997: The Orb – "Toxygene"
 1998: Paul van Dyk – "For an Angel"
 1998: Jonathan Peters Presents Luminaire – "Flower Duet"
 1998: Karen Ramirez – "Troubled Girl"
 1998: Liquid Child – "Diving Faces"
 1998: Natalie Imbruglia – "Smoke"
 1998: Opus III – "Fine Day"
 1999: Lost Witness – "Happiness Happening"
 1999: Orbital – "Nothing Left"
 1999: Hybrid – "If I Survive"
 1999: Lightning Seeds – "Life's Too Short"
 1999: Inner City – "Good Life"
 1999: Lustral – "Everytime"
 1999: Joi – "Asian Vibes"
 1999: Caspar Pound – "Pioneers of the Warped Groove"
 2000: James Holden – "Horizons"
 2000: Kosheen – "Catch"
 2000: Futura Sound – "Call My Name"
 2000: Submarine – "Sunbeam"
 2000: Ultra Violet – "Heaven"
 2000: Antarctica – "Return to Reality"
 2000: Freefall featuring Jan Johnston – "Skydive"
 2000: DFM – "Lovin' U"
 2001: BT – "Shame"
 2001: Tiësto – "Suburban Train"
 2001: Tarrentella – "Karma"
 2001: Joshua Ryan – "Pistolwhip"
 2001: Way Out West – "Intensify"
 2001: Vertigo – "Above It All"
 2002: Way Out West – "Mindcircus"
 2002: Ding Fei Fei – "Forgotten Moon"
 2002: Sunscreem – "Perfect Motion"
 2002: Lustral – "Broken"
 2002: Way Out West – "Stealth"
 2003: Dusk – "Stars"
 2003: Sattva – "Echo of Silence"
 2004: Unkle & Ian Brown – "Reign"
 2005: Camp & Leutwyler Present BCML – "Mr Horowitz"
 2005: Way Out West – "Don't Forget Me"
 2007: General Midi – "Never Gonna Stop the Show"
 2009: Sudha featuring Zoë Johnston – "Leche"
 2010: Way Out West – "The Gift"
 2016: Charlotte OC – "Darkest Hour"

Music videos

References

Discographies of British artists
Electronic music discographies
Discography